Daivampadi (also written as Thaivampadi, Theyyampadi or Theyyambadi) is a Hindu caste in Kerala. They form a part of the Ambalavasi community. This caste is also known as Brahmani or Brahmani-Daivampadi. They perform the Kalamezhuthum Pattum ritual in temples.

See also 
 Ambalavasi

Social groups of Kerala